The women's team sprint competition of the cycling events at the 2019 Pan American Games was held on August 1 at the Velodrome.

Records
Prior to this competition, the existing world and Games records were as follows:

Schedule

Results

Qualification
Fastest 4 teams advanced to the final.

Finals
The final classification is determined in the medal finals.

References

Track cycling at the 2019 Pan American Games
Women's team sprint